Röthlein is a municipality  in the district of Schweinfurt in Bavaria, Germany. The village is located south of Schweinfurt, close to the Main valley. The quarters are Röthlein, Heidenfeld and Hirschfeld.

References

Schweinfurt (district)